Nathanaël Gouin (born 5 March 1988) is a French classical pianist.

Training 
Born in Colombes in the northwestern suburbs of Paris, Gouin began studying piano and violin at the age of 3. Trained at the Conservatoire de Toulouse, he obtained his piano and chamber music prizes in Thierry Huillet's and Frédéric Vaysse-Knitter's classes. He was received unanimously at the Conservatoire de Paris. He followed courses at the Juilliard School in New York, and also at the Hochschule für Musik Freiburg and University of Music and Performing Arts Munich as well as at the Académie Musicale de Villecroze. He perfected his skills with Maria João Pires, Louis Lortie, Avedis Kouyoumdian, Jean-Claude Pennetier and also Dimitri Bashkirov.

He was artist in residence at the Chapelle Musicale Reine Elizabeth of Belgium, with Maria-João Pires, who presented him to the public as part of the Partitura project, a concept that combines different generations of musicians in sharing the stage.

Gouin founded a Piano Violin duet with Guillaume Chilemme, whose first recording of Ravel's sonatas was released in 2014. (Maguelone).

He has won numerous international competitions; In 2009 he won first prize at the Johannes Brahms Competition in Pörtschach, Austria, as well as the Swedish Duet Competition (1st prize) and the Lyon Chamber Music Competition.

Selected discography 
 Maurice Ravel's Sonates pour violon et piano (Maguelone)
 Édouard Lalo's Piano Concerto in F minor (Alpha)
 Franz Liszt  Macabre ( Mirare) 2017
 Dear Mademoiselle - A Tribute to Nadia Boulanger (with cellist Astrig Siranossian) Alpha 2020
 Georges Bizet Without words (Mirare) 2020

References

External links 
 Official website
 Nathanaël Gouin (La Belle Saison)
 Nathanaël Gouin (Radio Classique)
 Europe du Piano / Nathanaël Gouin / Beethoven (YouTube)

1988 births
Living people
People from Colombes
Conservatoire de Paris alumni
21st-century French male classical pianists